Greatest Hits: 1965–1992 is the first European compilation album by American singer-actress Cher, released on November 9, 1992, by Geffen Records. The album reached the top 10 in several European countries and topped the UK Albums Chart for 7 non-consecutive weeks where it became the best-selling album by a female artist of 1992.

Album information
Notable hit songs included on this album are "The Shoop Shoop Song", which charted at number one in more than 10 countries worldwide, "If I Could Turn Back Time", which was Cher's biggest hit at the time and "I Got You Babe". Three new songs were also recorded for this album: "Oh No Not My Baby" (originally sung by Maxine Brown), "Whenever You're Near", and a live recording of "Many Rivers to Cross" (originally sung by Jimmy Cliff).

Critical reception

AllMusic's Jose F. Promis gave the album three stars out of five. He described the album as "somewhat random — perhaps focusing exclusively on her rock hits would have been a better choice, because including just a couple of old tracks proves somewhat frustrating." He also points out that other hit songs like "Half-Breed" were not included and it affects the album.

Track listing
Credits adapted from the album's liner notes.

Notes
 John Durrill is incorrectly credited as John Durill

Personnel
Cher – Main Vocals
Sonny Bono – Main Vocals
Meat Loaf – Main Vocals
Ron Wikso – Drums (Track 3)
Hugh McDonald – Bass (Track 3)
Dave Amato – Guitar (Track 3)
David Shelley – Guitar (Track 3)
Gary Scott – Piano (Track 3)
Paul Mirkovich – Keyboards (Track 3)
Darlene Love – Background Vocals (Track 3)
Edna Wright – Background Vocals (Track 3)
Patty Darcy – Background Vocals (Track 3)
Snuff Garrett – Producer
Jon Bon Jovi – Producer
Dan Hersch – Mastering
Barry King – Photography
Harry Langdon – Photography

Charts

Weekly charts

Year-end charts

Certifications and sales

References

External links
Official Cher site
Geffen official site

1992 greatest hits albums
Cher compilation albums
Geffen Records compilation albums